Edward George Fryatt (born 8 April 1971) is an English golfer. His father Jim Fryatt was a professional footballer for a number of English clubs.

Fryatt was born in Rochdale. At the age of four he moved with his family to Las Vegas, Nevada, where his father was coaching. He took up golf at the age of 13, before attending University of Nevada, Las Vegas in his home town, and turning professional when he graduated in 1994.

Fryatt's ex-wife Michelle was named Mrs International in 2003; they have one adopted daughter, Faith.

Career
Fryatt joined the Nike Tour in 1995, but after an unsuccessful first season opted to play in Asia, where he won four times in three years on the Asia Golf Circuit and the Asian Tour. In 1999, he returned to the Nike Tour, and won once on his way to earning promotion to the full PGA Tour for the first time.

In his debut PGA Tour season in 2000, Fryatt recorded five top-10 finishes, including a tie for third, and finished 77th on the money list. He recorded two further top-10s in a consistent 2001 season, but lost his playing rights after a poor 2002. In 2003, he returned to the Nike Tour, by then renamed as the Nationwide Tour, but missed the cut in all eighteen events he played, although he did make the cut in his one PGA Tour event that year. His last tournament on either tour was in 2005.

At the 1997 U.S. Open, Fryatt became one of the few players in history to be penalised a stroke for slow play.

In 2014, Fryatt, applied and received his amateur status back from the USGA. He currently playing local and national amateur events.

Amateur wins
1994 NCAA West Regional

Professional wins (6)

Asian Tour wins (1)

Nike Tour wins (1)

Nike Tour playoff record (0–1)

Korean Tour wins (1)
1997 Shinhan Donghae Open

Asia Golf Circuit wins (3)

Results in major championships

CUT = missed the half-way cut
"T" = tied
Note: Fryatt never played in the Masters Tournament or The Open Championship.

Results in The Players Championship

CUT = missed the halfway cut

See also
1999 Nike Tour graduates

References

External links

English male golfers
UNLV Rebels men's golfers
PGA Tour golfers
Asian Tour golfers
Korn Ferry Tour graduates
Sportspeople from Rochdale
People from the Las Vegas Valley
1971 births
Living people